Edward Lee Croft (born July 24, 1969) is an American professional boxer and is the former WBC Continental Americas Super Bantamweight champion.

Professional career
Before fighting for the IBF Featherweight and the WBO Super Bantamweight titles, Edward beat the veteran Jerome Coffee to win the WBC Continental Americas Super Bantamweight title.

WBC featherweight title
On February 22, 2003 Croft was knocked out by WBC Featherweight champion Érik Morales at the Plaza Mexico in Mexico City.

References

Boxers from California
Lightweight boxers
1969 births
Living people
American male boxers